Euthalia patala, the grand duchess, is a butterfly of the family Nymphalidae (Limenitidinae). It is found in the Indomalayan realm.

Subspecies
E. p. patala North India, Nepal, Assam
E. p. taooana  (Moore, 1878)  Burma, Thailand, China
E. p. lengba  (Tytler, 1940)  Maniur

References

Butterflies described in 1844
patala